Marat Nikolayevich Burayev (born 22 October 1995) is a Russian football player who plays for Zhetysu.

Club career
He made his debut in the Russian Professional Football League for FC Spartak Vladikavkaz on 20 July 2017 in a game against FC Chayka Peschanokopskoye.

In November 2018, Burayev left Artsakh FC.

References

External links
 Profile by Russian Professional Football League
 
 

1995 births
Sportspeople from Vladikavkaz
Living people
Russian footballers
Russian expatriate footballers
Expatriate footballers in Armenia
Expatriate footballers in Belarus
Expatriate footballers in Kazakhstan
Association football midfielders
FC Sevastopol (Russia) players
FC Spartak Vladikavkaz players
FC Pyunik players
FC Noah players
FC Krymteplytsia Molodizhne players
FC Slutsk players
FC Akzhayik players
FC Zhetysu players
Russian Second League players
Armenian Premier League players
Belarusian Premier League players
Kazakhstan Premier League players